Albert William Newell (16 September 1921 – 3 February 1993) was an Australian rules footballer who played for the South Melbourne Football Club in the Victorian Football League (VFL).

Notes

External links 

Alby Newell's playing statistics from The VFA Project

1921 births
1993 deaths
Australian rules footballers from Victoria (Australia)
Sydney Swans players
Port Melbourne Football Club players